Eaton Corporation plc is an American-Irish  multinational power management company with 2021 sales of $19.63 billion, founded in the United States with global headquarters in Dublin, Ireland, and a secondary administrative center in Beachwood, Ohio. Eaton has more than 86,000 employees and sells products to customers in more than 175 countries.

History
In 1911, Joseph O. Eaton, brother-in-law Henning O. Taube and Viggo V. Torbensen, incorporated the Torbensen Gear and Axle Co. in Bloomfield, New Jersey. With financial backing from Torbensen's mother, the company was set to manufacture Torbensen's patented internal-gear truck axle. In 1914, the company moved to Cleveland, Ohio, to be closer to its core business, the automotive industry.

The Torbensen Axle Company incorporated in Ohio in 1916, succeeding the New Jersey corporation. A year later, Republic Motor Truck Company, Torbensen's largest customer bought out the company. But Eaton and Torbensen were not content and bowed out of Republic to form the Eaton Axle Company in 1919. A year later, in 1920, Eaton Axle Company merged with Standard Parts. Standard Parts went in receivership later the same year and was later liquidated. In 1923, Eaton bought the Torbensen Axle Co. back from Republic and changed the name to the Eaton Axle and Spring Company.

Eaton officers believed the quickest way to grow the business was through acquisitions and began buying companies in the automotive industry. By 1932, the diversified company changed its name to Eaton Manufacturing Company. In 1937, Eaton became international by opening a manufacturing plant in Canada. In 1958 Eaton Corporation acquired Fuller Manufacturing. The company name changed once again in 1965 to Eaton Yale & Towne Inc. after the acquisition of Yale & Towne Manufacturing Co. in 1963. Stockholders approved the change to the company's current name in 1971. In 1978, Eaton Corporation acquired Samuel Moore & Company, Kenway Systems, and Cutler-Hammer.

Current work
Eaton's businesses are divided into the following sectors:

Electrical
The electrical sector's products include circuit breakers, switchgear, busway, UPS systems, power distribution units, panel boards, load centers, motor controls, meters, sensors, relays and inverters. The main markets for the Electrical Americas and Electrical Rest of World segments are industrial, institutional, government, utility, commercial, residential, information technology and original equipment manufacturer customers.

Aerospace
For the aerospace industry, Eaton manufactures and markets a line of systems and components for hydraulic, fuel, motion control, pneumatic systems and engines.

Vehicle

The Vehicle Group comprises the company's truck and automotive segments, including the Roadranger division providing:
 Eaton clutches
 Eaton automated and mechanical transmissions
 Eaton hybrid power systems: mounted between the UltraShift automated manual transmission and clutch is an electric motor/generator, connected to a power inverter using lithium ion batteries, controlled with an electronic control module. The system has a fail-safe that reverts to conventional engine-powered operation should some fault occur.
 Roadranger synthetic lubricants
 Eaton MD mobile diagnostics solutions

The truck segment is involved in the design, manufacture and marketing of powertrain systems and other components for commercial vehicle markets. Key products include manual and automated transmissions, clutches, drive-line components, and hybrid power.

Eaton's automotive segment produces products such as superchargers, engine valves, valve train components, cylinder heads, locking and limited-slip differentials, heavy-duty drive-line components, fuel, emissions, and safety controls, transmission and engine controls, spoilers, exterior moldings, plastic components, and fluid connectors.

eMobility

eMobility sector combines elements of Eaton's electrical and vehicle businesses to deliver electric vehicle solutions to passenger car, commercial vehicle and off-highway OEMs.

Acquisitions and divestments
Eaton Electrical purchased the Westinghouse Distribution and Controls Business Unit in 1994 which was one of Eaton's largest acquisitions. The acquisition included all of the Westinghouse electrical distribution and control product business and also included stipulations that the Westinghouse name cannot be used by anyone else on these types of products for years. Today, Eaton Electrical manufactures electrical distribution and control products branded "Eaton" or "Cutler-Hammer", which can replace Westinghouse products in commercial and industrial applications.

Eaton spun off its semiconductor manufacturing equipment business as Axcelis Technologies in 2000.

In 2003, Eaton's Electrical Distribution and Control business (formerly known as Cutler-Hammer) acquired the electrical division of Delta plc.  This acquisition brought Delta's brands Holec, MEM, Tabula, Bill and Elek under the Eaton nameplate with the previous Westinghouse divisions and gave the company manufacturing facilities to meet IEC standards, one of the steps to become a global company and developing a worldwide standard.

Soon after this acquisition, Eaton entered a joint venture with Caterpillar Inc. and purchased 51% of I & S operations, now known as Intelligent Switchgear Organization, LLC. This was followed in 2004 by the acquisition of Powerware. The Powerware brand is known for the design and production of medium to large Uninterruptible Power System (UPS) devices.  After several years of co-branding UPS products "Eaton|Powerware" the company is switching to the single brand Eaton for all UPS products including; BladeUPS, 9355, 9390, 9395, and 9E.

In 2006, Eaton entered the data center power distribution market.  Initial products were internally developed PDU's and RPP's under the Powerware brand and included the PowerXpert metering system. A Powerware brand Static Transfer Switch was added to the portfolio through a brand-label relationship with Cyberex. To complete the power distribution portfolio Eaton released a line of rack power distribution products under its Powerware brand called ePDU. It acquired Aphel Technologies Ltd., a manufacturer of power distribution product for data centers based in Coventry, UK. Shortly after, it added Pulizzi Engineering Inc., a manufacturer of mission critical power distribution based in Santa Ana, California. In late 2007, it acquired the MGE Office Protection Systems division of Schneider Electric, as a result of Schneider's acquisition of APC. A Taiwanese manufacturer, Phoenixtec, was also acquired giving the company the highest share in the Chinese single-phase UPS market.

On 21 May 2012, Eaton announced that they had agreed to purchase Ireland-based Cooper Industries in a cash-and-stock deal valued at about $11.46 billion. The new company is called Eaton Corporation plc and is incorporated in Ireland. Then-Chairman and CEO of Eaton Alexander Cutler headed the new corporation. Cooper shareholders received $39.15 in cash and 0.77479 of a share in the newly created company for each Cooper share held. This is worth $72 per share based on Eaton's closing share price of $42.40 on 18 May 2012, and is 29% above Cooper's closing stock price. Eaton Corporation plc completed its acquisition of Cooper Industries on 30 Nov 2012. The $13 billion acquisition of Cooper (US$5.4B Sales revenue -2011), became the largest in Eaton's (US$16B Sales Revenue-2011) 101-year history.

On 17 Mar 2021, Eaton completed the acquisition of Tripp Lite for $1.65 billion. President and COO of Electrical Sector, Eaton Uday Yadav said “The acquisition of Tripp Lite will enhance the breadth of our edge computing and distributed IT product portfolio and expand our single-phase UPS business.”  The acquisition will further Eaton's access to the consumer market in which Tripp Lite has a strong position.

Eaton's hydraulics business, manufacturing systems and components for the agriculture, construction, mining, forestry, utility, material handling, machine tools, molding, power generation, primary metals, and oil and gas markets, was acquired by Danfoss in August 2021 for $3.3 billion.

Headquarters
From 1920s-1964 Eaton was based on East 140th Street in Cleveland, Ohio.  In 1964, the company moved its headquarters into the new Erieview Tower where it remained until 1983. In that year, Eaton Corporation moved into a 28-story Cleveland office tower which was renamed for it. Eaton relocated to its new 580,000 square foot facility, named Eaton Center, in Beachwood, Ohio in early 2013. They reincorporated, as a means of reducing their U.S. corporate tax burden, in Ireland as part of the Cooper merger involved establishing a registered head office in Dublin, Ireland but operational headquarters remain in Beachwood.

Senior leadership team

Craig Arnold CEO 
Heath Monesmith president and chief operating officer, electrical sector. Paulo Ruiz named president and chief operating officer, industrial sector.

Uday Yadav, who was COO for electrical sector, has moved on to take role of CEO in TKelevator.

Controversies

Racial harassment 
In 1995, Eaton Corp had to pay $1.25M in restitution to a former employee who had been subject to racial harassment. Incidents included food being thrown on his desk, food being thrown through the roof of his car, use of the N-word, and the presence of neo-nazi flyers at Eaton Corp. The employee developed psychological problems and slipped into homelessness shortly after being fired.

In 2020, an employee sued Eaton Corp for retaliation and facilitating a climate of racial harassment. After a profane outburst from a fellow worker, the plaintiff was assigned to work and train under a supervisor who abused him psychologically. The supervisor made frequent use of the N-word, made reference to slavery and lynching, and claimed his job was to get rid of black workers. The employee informed management of his hostile work environment, but management responded by disciplining the plaintiff himself.

Long-term benefits 
Back when Eaton Corp was struggling with bankruptcy, various employees on long-term benefits suddenly found themselves terminated. Eaton had failed to insure the plan that the employees had nonetheless paid for. This led to numerous suits against Eaton.

Tax avoidance 
In 2012, the acquisition of Cooper Industries made it possible for Eaton Corp to become an Irish company, which would sharply lower its corporate tax rate. The move was later denounced by both President Obama and President Donald Trump.

Triumph Group 
In 2004, Eaton Corp sued Triumph Group for trade secrets theft, but when it was discovered that the company’s lawyers were paying former Hinds County District Attorney Ed Peters to improperly influence then-Hinds County Circuit Judge Bobby DeLaughter, the defendants countersued. In 2014, Eaton Corp paid $135M to Triumph Group and $13M to six former employees to settle the long-running legal dispute. Judge Bobby DeLaughter was sentenced to 18 months in prison.

Corporate recognition and rankings

Recognitions include the following:
 Ranked #4 in "100 Best Corporate Citizens" of Corporate Responsibility Magazine in 2013, also ranking in Top 50 for Six Consecutive Years.
 Named to Thomson Reuters Top 100 Innovators List, 2011 - 2012 - 2013.

See also 
Cooper Industries
Eagle Electric
Powerware
Corporation tax in the Republic of Ireland#Corporate tax inversions

References

The History of Eaton Corporation 1911–1985
Securities and Exchange Commission

External links

Aerospace companies of the Republic of Ireland
Aircraft manufacturers of the United States
American brands
Auto parts suppliers of the United States
Automotive transmission makers
Beachwood, Ohio
Companies listed on the New York Stock Exchange
Electrical engineering companies
Golf equipment manufacturers
Manufacturing companies based in Dublin (city)
Manufacturing companies based in Ohio
Manufacturing companies established in 1911
Tax inversions